

Paleontologists
 Georges Cuvier is born.

References

18th century in paleontology
Paleontology